The Naval Reserve Armory is a building in the South Lake Union neighborhood of Seattle, Washington, United States. It is a large concrete structure influenced by the Moderne and Art Deco movements, which was built by the Works Progress Administration from 1941 to 1942. The main interior feature is a 133 x 100 ft (40.5 x 30 m) drill hall which was used by the U.S. Naval Reserve to train thousands of young recruits for service in World War II. The building is noted for its association with mass mobilization during the war as well as its involvement with Depression-era work relief.

The building was designed by Seattle architect William R. Grant and B. Marcus Priteca. Its construction was initially promoted by a citizens' committee but delayed by fears it would be a white elephant; eventually politicians endorsed and promoted the project, and it secured a $99,997 WPA grant. Later a $69,983 increase was granted, and the project was also funded by $6,399 from the State of Washington and $14,204 from, perhaps uncharacteristically, the University of Washington.

Construction of the building cost a total of $500,000. It was dedicated on July 4, 1942, a "grim summer" point during the war, at a ceremony attended by honored guest Mrs. Peter Barber, whose three sons had been killed in the Japanese attack on Pearl Harbor.

The armory was decommissioned after the war, but received renovation funding in 1946. It was disestablished in 1998.
The property was added to the National Register of Historic Places (NRHP) on July 8, 2009; the listing was announced as the featured listing in the National Park Service's weekly list of July 17, 2009.  As of that year, the building remained in good condition.

In 2012, the armory underwent a major renovation, and became home to Seattle's Museum of History and Industry. It is situated in what is now the Lake Union Park at the south end of Lake Union, a lake which was connected to Puget Sound by the Lake Washington Ship Canal in 1917. Previously the site had been used by the Eastern Mill, a sawmill.

References

External links
 Naval Reserve Armory photo, at Seattle Department of Neighborhoods landmarks
 "Lake Union Armory" photo, at Seattle Parks and Recreation Department
 Lake Union Park, with some info about the armory, at Seattle Parks and Recreation Department

Naval installations in Washington (state)
Military facilities on the National Register of Historic Places in Washington (state)
Art Deco architecture in Washington (state)
1940s architecture in the United States
Military facilities in Seattle
World War II on the National Register of Historic Places
South Lake Union, Seattle
National Register of Historic Places in Seattle
1942 establishments in Washington (state)